14 Women is a 2007 documentary film directed by Mary Lambert and narrated by Annette Bening. The film released on June 14, 2007 as part of Silverdocs, and focuses on several female Senators serving in the 109th United States Congress.

Synopsis
The film examines the 109th United States Congress. When it convened, there were fourteen women in the Senate: Barbara Boxer, Maria Cantwell, Hillary Clinton, Susan Collins, Elizabeth Dole, Dianne Feinstein, Kay Bailey Hutchison, Mary Landrieu, Blanche Lincoln (Lambert’s sister), Barbara Mikulski, Lisa Murkowski, Patty Murray, Olympia Snowe, and Debbie Stabenow. The documentary features interviews with several people, including the Senators' family members, Delaware Senator Joe Biden, and singer Alanis Morissette.

Reception
Politico.com and DVD Talk both gave positive reviews for 14 Women, with DVD Talk commented that while it was "far from definitive", the film has "admirable aims and will probably play well with schoolkids." Variety gave a more mixed response to the film, saying that "Political junkies, idealistic schoolgirls and everyone in between will be thrilled to vary-ing degrees" by the film but that it also felt like a "recruitment vid for public service".

References

External links
 Official Site
 

2007 films
American documentary films
Documentary films about American politicians
Documentary films about women in the United States
2007 documentary films
Films directed by Mary Lambert
Films scored by Jamshied Sharifi
Female members of the United States Congress
2000s English-language films
2000s American films